There have been two baronetcies created for persons with the surname Ramsden, one in the Baronetage of England and one in the Baronetage of the United Kingdom. One creation is extant as of 2008

The Ramsden, later Pennington, later Pennington-Ramsden Baronetcy, of Byram in the County of York, was created in the Baronetage of England on 30 November 1689 for John Ramsden in honour of the services he had given during the Glorious Revolution. The manor of Huddersfield had been in the Ramsden family since 1599, and the baronets retained this manor until 1920, when it was sold to the Corporation of the County Borough of Huddersfield, along with the substantial Ramsden Estate.

The third Baronet sat as Member of Parliament for Appleby. The fourth Baronet represented Grampound in the House of Commons. The fifth Baronet sat as Liberal Member of Parliament for Taunton, Hythe, the West Riding of Yorkshire and Monmouth and served as Under-Secretary of State for War from 1857 to 1858. The sixth Baronet was High Sheriff of Buckinghamshire in 1920. The seventh Baronet assumed in 1925 by deed poll the surname of Pennington in lieu of his patronymic according to the will of the late Lord Muncaster (see Baron Muncaster). However, in 1958 he resumed the use of the surname of Ramsden after that of Pennington. The subsequent Baronets have used the surname of Ramsden only. The seventh Baronet notably served as High Sheriff of Cumberland in 1962.

The Ramsden Baronetcy, of Birkensaw in the County of York, was created in the Baronetage of the United Kingdom on 1 July 1938. For more information on this creation, see the Baron Ramsden.

Ramsden, later Pennington, later Pennington-Ramsden baronets, of Byram (1689)
Sir John Ramsden, 1st Baronet (1648–1690)
Sir William Ramsden, 2nd Baronet (1672–1736)
Sir John Ramsden, 3rd Baronet (1699–1769)
Sir John Ramsden, 4th Baronet (1755–1839)
 John Charles Ramsden (1788–1836)
Sir John William Ramsden, 5th Baronet (1831–1914)
Sir John Frecheville Ramsden, 6th Baronet (1877–1958)
Sir (Geoffrey) William Pennington-Ramsden, 7th Baronet (1904–1986)
Sir Caryl Oliver Imbert Ramsden, 8th Baronet (1915–1987)
Sir John Charles Josslyn Ramsden, 9th Baronet (born 1950)

Ramsden baronets, of Birkensaw (1938)
see the Baron Ramsden

References

Specific

General
Kidd, Charles, Williamson, David (editors). Debrett's Peerage and Baronetage (1990 edition). New York: St Martin's Press, 1990, 

Ramsden
Extinct baronetcies in the Baronetage of the United Kingdom
1689 establishments in England